Hodan Hassan (born February 1, 1982) is an American politician serving in the Minnesota House of Representatives since 2019. A member of the Minnesota Democratic–Farmer–Labor Party (DFL), Hassan represents District 62A, which includes parts of Minneapolis in Hennepin County, Minnesota.

Early life, education, and career
Hassan immigrated to the United States from Somalia and moved to Minneapolis in 1999. She attended Metropolitan State University, graduating with a B.A. in social work, and Augsburg University, graduating with a M.A. in social work.

Hassan is a mental health clinician and the executive director for Pathways 2 Prosperity. She has worked as a senior clinical social worker for Hennepin County.

After two of her nieces were badly hurt in an Al-Shabaab terrorist shooting, Hassan became active in fighting extremism in Minnesota and rebuilding trust between Somali Minnesotans and the government. In 2015, she visited the White House as part of a Summit on Countering Violent Extremism. A youth mentor, Hassan said that fewer job and community opportunities make youth more susceptible to aggressive recruiting. She argued for a less punitive approach to a proposed female genital mutilation bill. She served as chairwoman of the Somali-American Task Force, which offered feedback to U.S. Attorney Andrew Luger on how to prevent recruitment from terrorist groups.

Minnesota House of Representatives
Hassan was elected to the Minnesota House of Representatives in 2018 and has been reelected every two years since. She first ran after 19-term incumbent Karen Clark announced she would not seek reelection. Hassan won the crowded DFL primary election, defeating future state senator Omar Fateh. She was the second Somali-American woman elected to the state legislature, after Ilhan Omar was elected in 2016. 

Hassan chairs the Economic Development Finance and Policy Committee, and sits on the Housing Finance and Policy, Ways and Means, and Workforce Development Finance and Policy Committees. In 2020-21 Hassan was vice chair of the Education Policy Committee. In 2019-20 she served as an assistant majority leader of the House DFL Caucus. Hassan is a member of the House People of Color and Indigenous (POCI) Caucus.

Hassan introduced the "Increase Teachers of Color Act", which would increase bonuses for hiring out-of-state teachers of color. In 2021, 34% of Minnesota students were nonwhite, compared to only 5% of teachers. She also introduced a bill that would add a personal finance course to Minnesota high school graduation requirements.

Hassan was a member of a working group on police use of deadly force led by Minnesota Public Safety Commissioner John Harrington and Minnesota Attorney General Keith Ellison. She has been outspoken on police reform. In 2019, she signed a letter to a judge asking them for leniency when sentencing Minneapolis police officer Mohamed Noor for the murder of Justine Damond. 

Hassan worked on legislation that would give women of color grants and assistance in starting businesses. She authored legislation that would expunge cases that don't end in eviction from a tenant's record and expunge eviction records more than three years old, arguing that tenants deserve a second chance. Hassan co-wrote an op-ed calling for a more racially equitable transit system, and investment in transit lines that run through historically marginalized communities.

During the 2021 Minneapolis mayoral election, Hassan did not endorse incumbent Jacob Frey, and signed on to a letter that advocated for a "new mayor" who would do more to end racial disparities and increase public safety. Before a visit by President Donald Trump, Hassan said, "Trump, his hate, and his bigotry is not welcome in Minnesota."

Electoral history

Personal life 
Hassan has two children and resides in the Ventura Village neighborhood in Minneapolis.

References

External links

 Official House of Representatives website
 Official campaign website

American politicians of Somalian descent
Living people
Politicians from Minneapolis
Metropolitan State University alumni
Augsburg University alumni
Democratic Party members of the Minnesota House of Representatives
21st-century American politicians
21st-century American women politicians
Women state legislators in Minnesota
Year of birth missing (living people)
Somalian emigrants to the United States